KMOJ (89.9 MHz) is a community-oriented noncommercial FM radio station in Minneapolis, Minnesota, airing a predominantly urban adult contemporary radio format. KMOJ's radio studios are on West Broadway Avenue in Minneapolis, and its transmitter is in Arden Hills.

KMOJ features soul, blues, urban gospel, reggae, jazz, hip-hop, spoken word, and talk shows aimed at African American listeners. It is owned and operated by the nonprofit Center for Communications and Development (CCD), on Minneapolis's north side. KMOJ is a member of AMPERS, Minnesota's independent public radio network.

History
KMOJ began in 1976 as WMOJ, a very low-power AM station at 1200 kHz that reached only a few blocks from its studios and transmitter in the Sumner-Olson and Glenwood-Lyndale public housing developments. The station expanded its reach with a move to FM in September 1978, becoming KMOJ at 89.7 FM with 10 watts of power from its transmitter and antenna atop a highrise near its studios at 810 5th Avenue North. A frequency change to 89.9 in 1984 was necessitated for a power increase to 1,000 watts; the transmitter site remained the same. In 1985, the studio moved to a newly built facility in an existing building across the street at 501 Bryant Avenue North.

The station has struggled with internal tension and lack of funds, among other things, since its inception. KMOJ was forced to move from its Girard Terrace studios in January 2007 after severe structural damage was discovered and the building was condemned and subsequently razed. The studios moved to a temporary location in the Uptown area of Minneapolis in March 2007 until a permanent location could be established. The station worked with the City of Minneapolis and moved to a building at West Broadway and Penn Avenue in 2010.

In 2011, KMOJ moved its transmitting facility from its longtime original site to a new facility in the northern suburb of Arden Hills and increased power to 6,200 watts. The old transmitter was given to a radio station in Nigeria on the same frequency.

HD Radio
KMOJ broadcasts its signal in HD Radio, and has two HD sub-channels. Its HD2 channel carries a Hip hop format branded as "The Ice", while its HD3 channel carries KVSC, a college radio station from St. Cloud State University.

See also
List of community radio stations in the United States

References

External links
Official website

Radio stations in Minneapolis–Saint Paul
Independent Public Radio
Community radio stations in the United States
Radio stations established in 1978
Urban adult contemporary radio stations in the United States